Jigureasa may refer to the following rivers in Romania:

 Jigureasa, a tributary of the Bănița in Hunedoara County
 Jigureasa, a tributary of the Strei in Hunedoara County

See also 
 Jiguroșița River